Jean Roy may refer to:

 Jean Roy (music critic) (1916–2011), French music critic and musicologist
 Jean Roy (politician) (1923–1996), Canadian politician
 Jean Sebastien Roy, Canadian motocross rider
 Jean Roy (Huguenot), South African winemaker

See also 
 Jean-Yves Roy (born 1949), Canadian politician